Conrad Marais (born 26 April 1989) is a Namibian rugby union player. He was named in Namibia's squad for the 2015 Rugby World Cup.

References

1989 births
Living people
Namibian rugby union players
Namibia international rugby union players
Place of birth missing (living people)
Western Province (rugby union) players
Pumas (Currie Cup) players
White Namibian people
Namibian Afrikaner people
Rugby union wings